A Time to Sing is the ninth studio album by American musician Hank Williams Jr. The album was issued by MGM Records as number SE 4540ST. The full title is: From The Motion Picture Sound Track Hank Williams Jr. Sings Songs From Metro-Goldwyn-Mayer's A Time To Sing. The song "Next Time I Say Goodbye I'm Leaving" is sung by Shelley Fabares.

Track listing

Side One
 "A Time to Sing" – 2:15
 "Next Time I Say Goodbye I'm Leaving"  vocals by Shelley Fabares – 2:26
 "Old Before My Time" – 1:59
 "Rock in My Shoe" – 2:08
 "Money Can't Buy Happiness" – 1:53

Side Two
 "A Man is on His Own" – 2:50
 "There's Gotta Be More to Life Than You" – 2:40
 "It's All Over But the Crying" – 2:34
 "Give Me The Hummingbird Line" – 2:20
 "A Time to Sing" – 2:40

References

External links
 Hank Williams Jr.'s Official Website

1968 albums
Hank Williams Jr. albums
Albums arranged by Bill McElhiney
MGM Records albums